Andrena fuscipes  is a Palearctic species of mining bee.

References

External links
Images representing Andrena fuscipes 

Hymenoptera of Europe
fuscipes
Insects described in 1802